The Netherlands is the main constituent country of the Kingdom of the Netherlands. It is a densely populated country located in Western Europe with three island territories in the Caribbean. The European part of the Netherlands borders Germany to the east, Belgium to the south, and the North Sea to the northwest, sharing maritime borders with Belgium, the United Kingdom, and Germany. The three largest cities in the Netherlands are Amsterdam, Rotterdam and The Hague. The port of Rotterdam is the world's largest port outside East-Asia, and by far the largest port in Europe.

The Netherlands has a market-based mixed economy, ranking 17th of 177 countries according to the Index of Economic Freedom. It had the thirteenth-highest per capita income in the world in 2013 according to the International Monetary Fund.

For further information on the types of business entities in this country and their abbreviations, see "Business entities in Netherlands".

Largest firms 

This list shows firms in the Fortune Global 500, which ranks firms by total revenues reported before March 31, 2017. Only the top five firms (if available) are included as a sample.

Notable firms 
This list includes notable companies with primary headquarters located in the country. The industry and sector follow the Industry Classification Benchmark taxonomy. Organizations which have ceased operations are included and noted as defunct.

See also 
 Dutch East India Company
 Dutch West India Company

References 

Netherlands
 

es:Anexo:Empresas de los Países Bajos#Empresas